Cuptana Island is an island in the Chonos Archipelago of Chile. Other names in NGA are Calcai, Guabtana, and Nevada.

See also
 List of islands of Chile

External links
 Islands of Chile @ United Nations Environment Programme
 World island information @ WorldIslandInfo.com
 South America Island High Points above 1000 meters
 United States Hydrographic Office, South America Pilot (1916)

Chonos Archipelago

es:Archipiélago de los Chonos#Isla Cuptana